Jacked Up! was a segment of the half-time show of Monday Night Football on ESPN that recapped what were subjectively the most violent tackles and blows during the preceding week of football.  Those both delivering and receiving blows were often shown to be injured as a result of the plays, which were shown from multiple angles and speeds, with commentators making celebratory remarks or delivering jokes.  Each highlight ended with the announcer describing the player taking the worst of the impact as being Jacked Up, with the other members of the desk often screaming the phrase in unison.

Jacked Up! was quietly cancelled by ESPN in the wake of concussion studies that showed a correlation with violent football collisions and CTE.

ESPN original programming